This is a list of women chemists. It should include those who have been important to the development or practice of chemistry. Their research or application has made significant contributions in the area of basic or applied chemistry.

Nobel Laureates

 2022 - Carolyn R. Bertozzi - for Bioorthogonal chemistry
 2020 – Emmanuelle Charpentier and Jennifer Doudna – for CRISPR gene editing
 2018 – Frances Arnold – directed evolution to engineer enzymes
 2009 – Ada E. Yonath – structure & function of the ribosome
 1964 – Dorothy Crowfoot Hodgkin – protein crystallography
 1935 – Irène Joliot-Curie – artificial radioactivity
 1911 – Marie Sklodowska-Curie – discovery of radium & polonium
Eight women have won the Nobel Prize in Chemistry (listed above), awarded annually since 1901 by the Royal Swedish Academy of Sciences. Marie Curie was the first woman to receive the prize in 1911, which was her second Nobel Prize (she also won the prize in physics in 1903, along with Pierre Curie and Henri Becquerel – making her the only woman to be award two Nobel prizes). Her prize in chemistry was for her "discovery of the elements radium and polonium, by the isolation of radium and the study of the nature and compounds of this remarkable element." Irene Joliot-Curie, Marie's daughter, became the second woman to be awarded this prize in 1935 for her discovery of artificial radioactivity. Dorothy Hodgkin won the prize in 1964 for the development of protein crystallography. Among her significant discoveries are the structures of penicillin and vitamin B12. Forty five years later, Ada Yonath shared the prize with Venkatraman Ramakrishnan and Thomas A. Steitz for the study of the structure and function of the ribosome.  Emmanuelle Charpentier and Jennifer A Doudna won the 2020 prize in chemistry “for the development of a method for genome editing.” Charpentier and Doudna are the first women to share the Nobel Prize in chemistry.

L'Oreal-UNESCO Awards for Women in Science Laureates (Chemistry) 

 2015 – Xie Yi (Asia-Pacific) – inorganic chemistry
 2015 – Molly S. Shoichet (North America) – photochemistry
 2011 – Faiza Al-Harafi (Africa/Arab States) – electrochemistry

List of women chemists

19th century
Mary Watson (1856–1933), one of the first two female chemistry students at the University of Oxford
Margaret Seward (1864–1929), one of the first two female chemistry students at the University of Oxford; signed the 1904 petition to the Chemical Society
Vera Bogdanovskaia (1868–1897), one of the first female Russian chemists
Gerty Cori (1896–1957) Jewish Czech-American biochemist who was the first American to win a Nobel Prize in science
Ida Freund (1863–1914), first woman to be a university chemistry lecturer in the United Kingdom
Louise Hammarström (1849–1917), Swedish mineral chemist, first formally trained female Swedish chemist
Edith Humphrey (1875–1978), inorganic chemist, probably the first British woman to gain a doctorate in chemistry 
Julia Lermontova (1846–1919), Russian chemist, first Russian female doctorate in chemistry
Laura Linton (1853–1915), American chemist, teacher, and physician
Rachel Lloyd (1839–1900), first American female to earn a doctorate in chemistry, first regularly admitted female member of the American Chemical Society, studied sugar beets
Muriel Wheldale Onslow (1880–1932), British biochemist
Marie Pasteur (1826–1910), French chemist and bacteriologist
Mary Engle Pennington (1872–1952), American chemist
Agnes Pockels (1862–1935), German chemist
Vera Popova (1867–1896), Russian chemist
Anna Sundström (1785–1871), Swedish chemist
Clara Immerwahr (1870–1915), the first woman to get her doctorate in chemistry in Germany
Ellen Swallow Richards (1842–1911), American industrial and environmental chemist
Anna Volkova (1800–1876), Russian chemist
Nadezhda Olimpievna Ziber-Shumova (died 1914), Russian chemist
Fanny Rysan Mulford Hitchcock (1851–1936), one of thirteen women to graduate with a degree in chemistry in the 1800s, and the first to graduate with a doctorate in philosophy of chemistry. Her areas of focus were in entomology, fish osteology, and plant pathology.

20th century
 Elly Agallidis (1914–2006), Greek physical chemist
 Nancy Allbritton, American analytical and biochemist
 Valerie Ashby, American chemist
 Barbara Askins (born 1939), American chemist
 Alice Ball (1892–1916), American chemist
 Carolyn Bertozzi (born 1966), American biochemist
 Cynthia Burrows, American physical organic chemist
 Asima Chatterjee (1917–2006), Indian organic chemist
 Sherry Chemler (born 1972), American organic chemist
 Astrid Cleve (1875–1968), Swedish chemist
 Mildred Cohn (1913–2009), American chemist
 Janine Cossy (born 1950), French organic chemist
 Maria Skłodowska-Curie (1867–1934), Polish-French physicist and chemist (discoverer of polonium and radium, pioneer in radiology); Nobel laureate in physics 1903, and in chemistry 1911
 Jillian Lee Dempsey (born 1983), American chemist
Sheila DeWitt, American organic chemist
 Vy M. Dong, American organic chemist
 Abigail Doyle (born 1980), American organic chemist
 Odile Eisenstein (born 1949), French, theoretical chemist
 Gertrude B. Elion (1918–1999), American biochemist (Nobel prize in Physiology or Medicine 1988 for drug development)
 Margaret Faul, Irish/American organic chemist
 Mary Peters Fieser (1909–1997), American organic chemist
 Marye Anne Fox (1947–2021), American physical organic chemist
 Rosalind Franklin (1920–1957), British physical chemist and crystallographer
 Helen Murray Free (1923–2021), American chemist
 Gunda I. Georg, German-trained medicinal chemist, professor of medicinal chemistry in the US
 Ellen Gleditsch (1879–1968), Norwegian radiochemist
Paula T. Hammond(1963-), American chemical engineer, MIT professor
 Anna J. Harrison (1912–1998), American organic chemist
 Darleane C. Hoffman (born 1926), American Nuclear chemist
 Icie Hoobler (1892–1984), American biochemist
 Dorothy Crowfoot Hodgkin (1910–1994), British crystallographer, Nobel prize in chemistry 1964
 Donna M. Huryn, American organic chemist 
 Clara Immerwahr (1870–1915), German chemist
 Allene Rosalind Jeanes (1906–1995), American organic chemist
 Malika Jeffries-EL, American organic chemist
 Irène Joliot-Curie (1897–1956), French chemist and nuclear physicist, Nobel Prize in Chemistry 1935
 Madeleine M. Joullié (born 1927), Brazilian, American organic chemist 
 Isabella Karle (1921–2017), American crystallographer
 Joyce Jacobson Kaufman (1929–2016), American chemist, Pharmacologist
 Judith Klinman (born 1941), American biochemist
 Marisa Kozlowski, American organic chemist
 Stephanie Kwolek (1923–2014), American chemist, inventor of Kevlar
 Kathleen Lonsdale (1903–1971), British crystallographer
 Yvonne Connolly Martin (born 1936), American physical biochemist working on cheminformatics and computer-aided drug design in the US
 Marie Marynard Daly (1921–2001), First African American woman to earn her PhD in the United States
 Cynthia A. Maryanoff (born 1949), American organic/medicinal chemist
 Elizabeth Moran, British chemist and public analyst
 Maud Menten (1879–1960), Canadian biochemist
 Helen Vaughn Michel (born 1932), American nuclear chemist
 Alexandra Navrotsky (born 1943), American geochemist
 Dorothy Virginia Nightingale (1902–2000), American organic chemist
Yolanda Ortiz (chemist) (1924–2019), Argentine chemist, environmentalist
 Kathlyn Parker, American organic chemist
 Emma Parmee, British-born medicinal/organic chemist
 Mary Engle Pennington (1872–1952), American food chemist
 Eva Philbin (1914–2005), Irish chemist
 Iphigenia Photaki (1921–1983), Greek organic chemist
 Darshan Ranganathan (1941–2001), Indian organic chemist
 Mildred Rebstock (1919–2011), American Pharmaceutical chemist
 Sibyl Martha Rock (1909–1981), American pioneer in mass spectrometry and computing
 Elizabeth Rona (1890–1981), Hungarian (naturalized American) nuclear chemist and polonium expert
 Mary Swartz Rose (1874–1941), Nutrition chemist
 Melanie Sanford (born 1975), American organic chemist
 Maxine L. Savitz (born 1937), organic and electrochemist
 Patsy Sherman (1930–2008), American chemist, co-inventor of Scotchgard
 Odette L. Shotwell (1922–1998), organic chemist
 Jean'ne Shreeve (born 1933), American organic chemist
 Dorothy Martin Simon (1919–2016), American physical chemist
 Susan Solomon (born 1956), Atmospheric chemist
 JoAnne Stubbe (born 1946), American biochemist
 Ida Noddack Tacke (1896–1978), German chemist and physicist
 Giuliana Tesoro (1921–2002), Polymer chemist
 Margaret Thatcher (1925–2013), British chemist and Prime Minister
 Jean Thomas, British biochemist (chromatin)
 Martha J. B. Thomas (1926–2006), Analytical chemist and chemical engineer
 Ann E. Weber, American organic/medicinal chemist 
 Karen Wetterhahn (1948–1997), American metal toxicologist
 Ruth R. Wexler (born 1955), American organic and medicinal chemist, discoverer of two marketed drugs
 M. Christina White (born 1970), American organometallic chemist
 Charlotte Williams, English inorganic chemist
 Angela K. Wilson, American computational, theoretical, and physical chemist
 Rosalyn Sussman Yalow (1921–2011), American biochemist
 Jean Youatt (born 1925), Australian chemist, biochemist, and microbiologist
 Ada Yonath (born 1939), Israeli crystallographer, Nobel prize in chemistry 2009
 Glaci Zancan (1935–2007), Brazilian biochemist, president of the Brazilian Society for the Progress of the Science (SBPC) from 1999 to 2003

21st century 

Emily Balskus (born 1980), American organic chemist and microbiologist
Paula T. Hammond (born 1963), American chemical engineer, MIT professor
Jeanne Hardy, American biophysicist and chemical biologist
Geraldine Harriman, American executive and medicinal chemist
Rachel Haurwitz (born 1985), American biochemist and structural biologist
Katja Loos (born 1971), German polymer chemist working at the University of Groningen, The Netherlands
Rachel Mamlok-Naaman, Israeli chemist, specialized in chemistry education
Lisa Marcaurelle, American synthetic chemist in industry
Catherine J. Murphy, American chemist
Sarah O'Connor, American plant synthetic biologist working in England
Sarah E Reisman (born 1979), American organic chemist
Seble Wagaw, American process chemist and pharma exec
Marcey Lynn Waters, American chemical biologist and supramolecular chemist
Jenny Y Yang, American chemist and clean energy researcher at UCI
Wendy Young, American chemist at Genentech
Jaqueline Kiplinger, American chemist working at the Los Alamos National Laboratory

See also 

 List of female mass spectrometrists

References

 
Chemists
Women chemists